Nadezhda Myskiv is a former Russian football defender, who played for Zorky Krasnogorsk in the Russian Championship.

She was included in the Russia national team for the 2009 European Championship replacing Maria Dyachkova.

References

1988 births
Living people
Russian women's footballers
Russia women's international footballers
WFC Rossiyanka players
FC Zorky Krasnogorsk (women) players
Women's association football midfielders
Russian Women's Football Championship players